The Case of Tariel Mklavadze (Georgian:Tariel mklavadzis mkvlelobis saqme) is a 1925 Soviet silent horror film directed by Ivane Perestiani.

Cast
 Kote Mikaberidze as Spiridon Mtsirishvili  
 Nato Vachnadze as Despine  
 Mikheil Kadagidze as Tariel Mklavadze  
 Dimitri Kipiani

References

Bibliography 
 Rollberg, Peter. Historical Dictionary of Russian and Soviet Cinema. Scarecrow Press, 2008.

External links 
 

1925 films
1925 horror films
Soviet silent feature films
Georgian-language films
Films directed by Ivan Perestiani
Soviet black-and-white films
Soviet horror films
Silent horror films
Soviet-era films from Georgia (country)